Arkadiy Sergeyevich Shestakov (born 24 March 1995) is a Kazakhstani ice hockey player for Barys Astana in the Kontinental Hockey League (KHL) and the Kazakhstani national team.

He represented Kazakhstan at the 2021 IIHF World Championship.

References

External links

1995 births
Living people
Barys Nur-Sultan players
Kazakhstani ice hockey centres
Kazzinc-Torpedo players
Sportspeople from Oskemen